Larapinta is a suburb of the town of Alice Springs, in the Northern Territory, Australia. It is on the western side of Alice Springs.

The name of the suburb is an Aboriginal name for the Finke River.

References

Suburbs of Alice Springs